HSC Speedrunner Jet is a fast ferry owned by Seajets thαt operates between Sitia, Kasos, Karpathos, Chalki and Rhodos. She was built in 1999 at Fincantieri, Riva Trigoso, Italy, for Sea Containers as HSC SuperSeaCat Three. Under that name she sailed on Sea Container's services around the British Isles, as well as with its subsidiaries Silja Line and SuperSeaCat on the Baltic Sea.

History
SuperSeaCat Three was the third mono-hulled fast ferry to be built for Sea Containers. She was initially set in traffic between Liverpool, England and Dublin, Ireland. In 2000 Dublin was switched to Douglas, Isle of Man. The following year SuperSeaCat Three started operating between Dover, England and Calais, France.

Since the year 2000 Sea Containers had operated HSC SuperSeaCat Four between Helsinki and Tallinn, marketed as a part of their Silja Line brand. The route was highly profitable and in 2003 It was decided that SuperSeaCat Three should join her sister in that service. Due to the Baltic Sea freezing during winter, the service could not be operated between January and April each year, so the ship spent those month laid up. For the summer season of 2005 a third ship, HSC SuperSeaCat One was added to the service.

In late 2005, Sea Containers decided to sell their flights, including the lucrative Silja Line. However, the company that bought Silja Line, Estonian ferry operator Tallink, already operated several fast ferries (as well as traditional ferries) between Helsinki and Tallinn. As a result, they could not take over the SuperSeaCats as that would have given them a dominant market position on the route. Hence Sea Containers decided, despite its earlier decision, to continue operating SuperSeaCat Three and Four under the SuperSeaCat brand.

On 12 October 2007 the SuperSeaCat Three collided with HSC Tallink AutoExpress 2 in Tallinn harbour. Due to strong winds the SuperSeaCat Three was assisted by a tug, but this was not enough to prevent the collision. No passengers were harmed, but the SuperSeaCat Three tore a meter-long hole on the side of the AutoExpress 2.

In 2008, SuperSeaCat Three was sold to Greek company Aegean Speed Lines, along with her sister ship SuperSeaCat Four. Both ships remained in service between Helsinki and Tallinn. However, in 2009, the company decided to bring both ships to Greek service. The SuperSeaCat Three arrived on 17 June 2009, was renamed Speedrunner III and began service on 25 June 2009 on the Piraeus-Syros-Tinos-Mykonos line, which she also served in 2010 and 2011. In 2012 she was laid-up in Eleusis Bay due to her company's economic difficulties, but she returned to service the following year, operating on the Piraeus-Serifos-Sifnos-Milos line, where she also remained in 2014. In 2015 she was chartered to Moroccan company Navline, operating between Algeciras and Tanger. In 2016, she returned to Greece and was chartered to Levante Ferries of Ionian Group, operating in the Ionian Sea, on the Patras-Sami-Ithaca line. In late 2016, following the sale of her fleetmate Speedrunner IV, she returned to Aegean Speed Lines, and is due to operate in the Cyclades again in 2017.

In May 2022, Speedrunner III was sold to Seajets and was renamed Speedrunner Jet. Since July 15, it operates between Sitia, Kasos, Karpathos, Chalki and Rhodos.

References

External links 
SuperSeaCat Three at Fakta om Fartyg (in Swedish)

Ships of Seajets
Ferries of Finland
Ferries of Greece
Ferries of Estonia
Ships built in Italy
MDV 1200-class fast ferries
Ships built by Fincantieri
1998 ships